Robert Ronald Maslyn Williams (20 February 1911 – 11 August 1999) was an Australian documentary filmmaker and writer.

He was born in England and moved to Australia in the 1920s, where he grew up in the New England and Southern Highlands districts of New South Wales. He studied at the Conservatorium of Music in Sydney and worked as a journalist before going into filmmaking.

In 1940, he joined the Official War Film and Photographic Unit as a writer-producer and served under Frank Hurley in the Middle East. He worked for the Australian Information Bureau in New York in 1945 and the Canadian Film Board in 1946.

In 1962 he left filmmaking and became a writer.

Select filmography
Mike and Stefani (1952)
New Guinea Patrol

References

External links

R Maslyn Williams at Austit
Papers of R Maslyn Williams
Short story "Three Sons" by Williams

Australian documentary filmmakers
1911 births
1999 deaths
British emigrants to Australia